Ryo Sakata (坂田 遼, born October 2, 1986 in Yokosuka, Kanagawa) is a Japanese professional baseball outfielder for the Saitama Seibu Lions in Japan's Nippon Professional Baseball.

External links

NPB.com

1986 births
Living people
Baseball people from Kanagawa Prefecture
Japanese baseball players
Nippon Professional Baseball outfielders
Saitama Seibu Lions players